Korean traditional rhythm also called Jangdan (장단) is a rhythm which the rhythmic form is repeated with percussion instrument such as Janggu or hourglass drum. There is a basic format but there are many variations while playing the songs. Korean traditional music is usually singing within the Jangdan played by Janggu or eastern drum. This accompaniment is called 'hitting the Jangdan'. But in music mainly composed by percussion instrument like Korean traditional folk music, it is called 'hitting the steel' or 'hitting the Pungmul(풍물)' which is a Korean traditional folk music. Jangdan can be categorized into two groups: Jeong-Ak (Formal music) Jangdan and Min-Sok-Ak (traditional folk music) Jangdan.

How to read Jangdan 
When playing janggu, usually chae is used by right hand, and nothing on left. However, while playing outdoor music or Samul nori, people use gung chae with their left hand. Also, it is general to hit the middle side of the chae side, but exceptionally, corner of the chae side with small volume is used while playing solo or indoor music.

Jeong-Ak (Formal music) Jangdan 
Jangdan used in Jeong-Ak is usually played by Janggu. It is often used in Jangdan in Young-San-Hoe-Sang(靈山會相). Also, Jangdan in music for national ceremonies is an example. There are many combinations of rhythms in slow Jeong-Ak Jangdan, and many Doduri in normal speed Jangdan, and many Ta-ryoung in fast Jangdan.

Sang-Young-San Jangdan 
Sang-Young-San Jangdan is a very slow 10-beat tempo. If one beat is considered as a half note, the Jangdan is a 10/2 beat tempo, and if considered a quarter note, the Jangdan is a 10/8+8+8 beat tempo. Sometime it is considered 20 beat tempo for very slow music. The Sang-Young-San Jangdan is used in the first and middle part of the Young-San-Hoe-Sang(靈山會相), 1~3 chapter of Yeo-Min-Rak (與民樂), 1~4 chapter of Bo-Heo-Sa/Bo-Heo-Ja(步虛子).

Se-Ryoung-San Jangdan 
Se-Ryoung-San Jangdan is a 10 beat tempo, similar to Sang-Young-San Jangdan, but a bit faster so it has many variations. It is used in Se-young-San in Young-San-Hoe-Sang, Ga-Rak-Deo-Ri, 4~7 chapter of Yeo-Min-Rak, and 5~7 chapter of Bo-Heo-Sa/Bo-Heo-Ja(步虛子).

Doduri Jangdan 
Doduri Jangdan is the most used Jangdan in Jeong-Ak (formal music), a 6 beat tempo in normal speed. It has many variations that depends on the song.

Chee-Ta Jangdan 
Chee-Ta Jangdan is used in marching music. It is a 12-beat tempo.

Ga-Gok (songs with singing/lyrics) Jangdan 
In most Ga-Gok, the Jangdan mostly has a 16-beat tempo.

Extra Jangdan 

 Ga-sa Jangdan
 Si-jo Jangdan

Min-Sok-Ak (traditional folk music) Jangdan 
There are many categories in traditional folk music.  Pansori Jangdan is played by a drum, the Jangdan of Ip-Chang is played by Sogo (mini drum). The Jangdan of all traditional instrumental music are played by Jang-gu.

Gutgeori (굿거리) 
Gutgeori jang dan is 12 beats jang dan most played in Folk music with Semati jang dan. Gutgeori ja dan's basic rhythm is ‘(덩기덕 쿵 더러러러 쿵기덕 쿵 더러러러)’. It's played in various cases like pansori, sanjo, muak and dancing music. For example, Gutgeori is played in Folk music like Nuilliliya, Hangangsu-talyeoung, Pungnyeon-ga. it's played in Gut in Seoul, Gyeonggi, Jeolla. In this case, it is usually made up with piri, haegum, janggu in Seoul or Gyeonggi, and we add jing at Jeolla's Gut.

Dodeuri (도드리) 
Dodeuri jangdan is played in various kind of music and it's changed its rhythm by purposes. Music with Dodley jangdan gives us grave and strong feelings. Dodley of eight-eighteen times or six-four times used in Yeongsan-Hoesang, and Dodley of six-two times used in pansori like Chunmyeongog or Jugjisa. Otherwise we play Dodley jangdan for court dance as Cheoyongmu, Pogulag and Samhyeon dodley which is made up with Samhyeon-yuggag.

Semachi (세마치) 
‘Semachi’ means ‘finish at third turn’ namely play three times. Its basic rhythm is (덩덩덕쿵덕). Semachi jangdan is a bit fast three beats jangdan. We divide it one time as three beats so we could play the nine-eight times jangdan. Music with Semachi jangdan gives us cheerful and valiant feelings. Semati jangdan is one of the jangdan played in pansori and nongak. For example, it's played in Yangsando, Ginbanga-Talyeong, Jindo-Arirang, Bellflower-Talyeong.·

Eotmori (엇모리) 
‘Eotmori’ means jangdan which go forward in rotation. Its basic rhythm is (더엉궁 따악 구웅 궁 따악). Urmorie jangdan is very fast ten-eight times jangdan. Unusually, it is composed with 3-beats and 2-beats rotation instead of the same rhythm's repetition. Urmorie jangdan is played in pansori and sanjo. There are late Urmorie and frequent Urmorie jangdan which have different speed. Pansori is usually made up with late Urmorie and frequent Urmorie jangdan. Sanjo is usually made up with late Urmorie Jangdan.

Jajinmori (자진모리) 
‘Jajinmori’ means ‘Frequently’ jangdan. Its basic rhythm is (덩 쿵 쿵덕쿵). Jajinmori jangdan is fast eight-twelve times jangdan which is played in pansori or sanjo. We can play its 3beats together as one time, and this case one jangdan is same as 4times. Music with Jajinmori jangdan gives us active and enchanting feelings. Jajinmori jangdan is usually played in pansori, sanjo, nongak and Muga, especially dramatic and urgent parts. We could see Jajinmorie jangdan in Chunhyang-ga, Simcheong-ga. Heungbu-ga, Jeokbyeok-ga.

Jungmori (중모리) 
This is one of the jangdan in Korean traditional music. This jangdan is composed of 12 tempos and usually used in pansori sanjo and minyo the Korean traditional folk song. These tempos are average 12 tempos and 1 tempo is expressed as quarter note so total tempo of the 12/4 beat. In Pansori this jangdan is used in descriptive part or emotional parts. Famous usage of this jangdan is <Chunhyangga>'s SSukdaemuri and <Heungboga>'s Ganantaryeong.

Jungjungmori (중중모리) 
Jungjungmorie is usually used in part which is very fun and exciting but sometimes used in part which expresses struggling and wailing. Most famous part which uses Jungjungmorie is <Chunhyangga>’s gisanyeongsu.

Jinyangjo (진양조) 
This jangdan is the slowest jangdan used in Pansori or Sanjo. 6 beats composes one gak and 4 gak composes 1 jangdan so 1 jangdan is composed of 24 beats. At pushing sound we use first gak and in hanging sound and third gak for binding sounds and last gak for unwinding sound. The number of  depends on the binding and unwinding of sounds. This jangdan is usually used in lyrical, leisurely, majestic, fluffy, or crying lyrical parts

Hwimori (휘모리) 
By its name ‘Hwimorie(휘모리)’ we can notice that this jangdan is as fast as a whirlwind. At first beat we make ‘’, and at the late third beat we hit strong with chae. This jangdan is wrote as 4/4 or 12/8 beats. This is the fastest jangdan used in Pansori or Sanjo and usually used in a situation which is very busy. The most famous part which uses this jangdan is the end of <Choonhyangga>’s sinyunmadji.

Utjungmori (엇중모리) 
This jangdan is used in Pansori and composed of 6 beats and the speed is average speed. It is used at the end of the part where the boss tells the story or at the end of the pansori. The most famous part which uses this jangdan is <Choonhyangga>’s By hoedongsungchampan younggam.

References 
 http://www.gugak.go.kr/site/homepage/menu/viewMenu?menuid=001003001001001003(National Korean traditional music center)
 https://ko.wikipedia.org/wiki/장단
 http://www.culturecontent.com/content/contentView.do?search_div=CP_THE&search_div_id=CP_THE008&cp_code=cp0418&index_id=cp04180048&content_id=cp041800480001&search_left_menu=(Korea Creative Content Agency)

Korean traditional music